A native of Columbia, Concertmaster Mary Lee Taylor Kinosian, of the South Carolina Philharmonic Orchestra, began studying music at five and joined the Columbia Philharmonic Orchestra (later the S.C. Philharmonic) at fourteen. She enjoyed a successful career in San Jose, Calif. (with the San Jose Symphony, Midsummer Mozart Festival and as concertmaster and soloist with the Redwood Symphony) and Nashville, Tenn. (as principal second violin with Nashville Symphony Orchestra and the Nashville String Machine) before returning to Columbia in 1996. Since that time she has played numerous engagements, ranging from musical theatre to her well-received performance of Kurt Weill's Violin Concerto with the Philharmonic. Her work with the Upton Trio, as both composer and violinist, has been featured on NPR's Theme and Variations. She appears frequently with the Sterling Chamber Players and also serves as the assistant concertmaster of the Greenville Symphony. She lives in Columbia, SC with her daughters Catherine, Jessica, and Cristina.

External links
https://web.archive.org/web/20080515054754/http://www.maryleetaylor.com/

Year of birth missing (living people)
Living people
American classical violinists
Place of birth missing (living people)
21st-century classical violinists